Joseph William Thurston (born September 29, 1979) is an American former professional baseball third baseman and second baseman. He played for the Los Angeles Dodgers, Philadelphia Phillies, Boston Red Sox, St. Louis Cardinals, and Florida Marlins in Major League Baseball (MLB). He is currently on the coaching staff of the minor league Class A (Advanced) California League Modesto Nuts.

Amateur career
Thurston graduated from Vallejo High School in Vallejo, California.

Professional career

Los Angeles Dodgers

Playing for the Las Vegas 51s of the AAA Pacific Coast League, Thurston hit .334 with an .878 OPS and 22 stolen bases in 2002, earning him the L.A. Dodgers' Minor League Player of the Year Award and Baseball Americas AAA Player of the Year honors. Thurston made his major-league debut on September 2,  for the Los Angeles Dodgers, hitting .462 in eight games.

But 2002 would ultimately be the peak of Thurston's minor-league career. The expectation that he would be a future star had evaporated. On July 29, the Dodgers shipped Thurston to the New York Yankees as part of a conditional deal. He played for their Triple-A team, the Columbus Clippers and was granted free agency after the season.

Philadelphia Phillies
He signed a minor-league contract with the Philadelphia Phillies on January 28, . He was assigned to Triple-A Scranton/Wilkes-Barre to begin the season and his contract purchased on August 22, 2006. He would stay with the Phillies for the rest of the season and played in 18 games going 4-for-18 (.222 batting average). He was released after the season. On December 1, he signed a minor league contract with the Washington Nationals that included an invitation to spring training. He did not make the major league club and was released.

He was then once again picked up by the Philadelphia Phillies and was assigned to their Double-A team, the Reading Phillies. He played four games for the Reading Phillies before earning a callup to Triple-A Ottawa. He had his contract purchased by the big league club on July 27, after second baseman Chase Utley was placed on the disabled list. He was demoted the next day after the acquisition of Tadahito Iguchi. Thurston spent the rest of the 2007 season with Ottawa. He became a free agent after the season.

Boston Red Sox
On December 13, Thurston signed with the Boston Red Sox to a minor league contract with an invitation to spring training. On March 19, he was assigned to the minor league camp. On April 16, he was brought up to the Red Sox from Pawtucket to replace the injured Alex Cora.

St. Louis Cardinals
On April 22, 2008, Thurston was designated for assignment and subsequently played in the Puerto Rican winter league in 2008 on a team managed by Eduardo Pérez. Pérez was impressed with Thurston's versatility and thought his style of play would be a good fit with manager Tony La Russa of the St. Louis Cardinals. Perez recommended Thurston to LaRussa, and on December 16, 2008 he signed a minor league deal with the St. Louis Cardinals. He made his debut with the Cardinals on April 6,  as a pinch runner. He also played third base and scored a run.

Thurston earned his first significant major league playing time as a utility player with the 2009 Cardinals. He frequently played third base before the Cardinals acquired Mark DeRosa, and also appeared at second base, in left field, and as a pinch hitter. In November 2009, Thurston was granted free agency.

Atlanta Braves
On December 18, 2009, Thurston signed a minor league contract with the Atlanta Braves. He also received an invite to spring training.

Florida Marlins
Thurston enjoyed a terrific season with Class AAA New Orleans Zephyrs in 2011. He led the team in almost every offensive category at the time of his promotion to the Marlins on August 5. After starting in a game against the Cardinals, Thurston was designated for assignment on August 6. He became a free agent at season's end.

Later career
The Houston Astros signed Thurston to a minor league contract on November 13, 2011. He also received an invitation to spring training. He was released by the Astros on March 28, 2012. Just an hour later, however, he was signed to a minor league contract with the Philadelphia Phillies. He was released by the Phillies on April 23 after batting just .207 in 11 games with the Lehigh Valley IronPigs. Thurston signed with the Minnesota Twins on April 25 and was assigned to the Rochester Red Wings. On May 14, 2012, Thurston was released by the Minnesota Twins.

Thurston played 58 games with the York Revolution of the independent Atlantic League in 2012, batting .314 with eight home runs and 28 RBI. In 2013, Thurston played 21 games with the Lancaster Barnstormers of the Atlantic League, batting .329.

On March 6, 2013, Thurston signed with the Leones de Yucatán (Yucatán Lions) in the Mexican Baseball League. Thurston later would make his debut after receiving a traveling visa.

Thurston also played for the Bravos de Margarita, Cardenales de Lara and Pastora de los Llanos clubs of the Venezuelan Professional Baseball League.

Thurston signed a minor league deal with the Milwaukee Brewers on January 25, 2014. He was released on March 27.

On March 6, 2015, Thurston signed a minor league contract with the Boston Red Sox.

Coaching career
In 2020, Thurston was the first base coach for the Seattle Mariners.

Personal
Thurston's first child was born in 2009.

Awards and recognition
 2000 – Los Angeles Dodgers Minor League Player of the Year, California League All-Star SS
 2002 – Baseball America 2nd team Minor League All-Star 2B, Triple-A All-Star 2B, Los Angeles Dodgers Minor League Player of the Year, Pacific League All-Star 2B, AAA Player of the Year
 2005 – Pacific Coast League All-Star 2B
 2006 – International League All-Star 2B
 2011 – IBAF Baseball World Cup All-Star 2B

References

External links

Joe Thurston at SABR (Baseball BioProject)

1979 births
Living people
African-American baseball players
American expatriate baseball players in Canada
American expatriate baseball players in Mexico
Baseball players at the 2011 Pan American Games
Baseball coaches from California
Baseball players from California
Boston Red Sox players
Bravos de Margarita players
Cardenales de Lara players
American expatriate baseball players in Venezuela
Columbus Clippers players
Florida Marlins players
Guerreros de Oaxaca players
Gwinnett Braves players
Jacksonville Suns players
Lancaster Barnstormers players
Las Vegas 51s players
Lehigh Valley IronPigs players
Leones de Ponce players
Leones de Yucatán players
Los Angeles Dodgers players
Major League Baseball second basemen
Mexican League baseball center fielders
Mexican League baseball left fielders
Mexican League baseball second basemen
Mexican League baseball shortstops
Mexican League baseball third basemen
Minor league baseball coaches
New Orleans Zephyrs players
Ottawa Lynx players
Pan American Games medalists in baseball
Pan American Games silver medalists for the United States
Pastora de los Llanos players
Pawtucket Red Sox players
People from Fairfield, California
Philadelphia Phillies players
Piratas de Campeche players
Reading Phillies players
Rochester Red Wings players
St. Louis Cardinals players
Sacramento City Panthers baseball players
San Bernardino Stampede players
Scranton/Wilkes-Barre Red Barons players
Sportspeople from Vallejo, California
Yaquis de Obregón players
Yakima Bears players
York Revolution players
United States national baseball team players
Medalists at the 2011 Pan American Games
21st-century African-American sportspeople
20th-century African-American sportspeople